The Ghost of St. Michael's is a 1941 British comedy-thriller film, produced by Ealing Studios.

Will Hay, the film's star, replaced his sidekicks, Graham Moffatt and Moore Marriott, from his previous film Where's That Fire? with comedian Claude Hulbert. Hay and Hulbert would act together again in My Learned Friend two years later.

Typical of comedies made during the war, it has an anti-Nazi plot.

Plot
An ineffectual science teacher William Lamb (Will Hay) is hired by a school normally located in middle England (St Michael's) recently transferred because of World War II evacuation policy to the remote Dunbain Castle on the Isle of Skye, Scotland. Posing as (amongst many other things) an Old Etonian, Lamb settles down into his new surroundings and becomes acquainted with the various local Scottish traditions and legends that abound and strikes up a friendship with one of the other masters, Hilary Tisdaile (Claude Hulbert).

However, shortly after his arrival an ancient curse returns to Dunbain Castle. The sound of bagpipes signals the death of a member of staff. Two die and Lamb is initially regarded as a suspect. With his friend appointed as the new headmaster (and the next potential victim), Lamb must solve the mystery of the mysterious murders with the assistance of mischievous know-all schoolboy Percy Thorne (Charles Hawtrey). A Nazi spy ring proves to be behind the killings, and is defeated by a British agent hidden amongst the staff.

In one of the more memorable scenes Lamb is trapped inside a secret room with the ceiling slowly descending upon him. They hide under an iron table but the legs start to bend.

Mrs Wigmore (who has proved to be the traitor) tries to shoot her way to escape but the bullets bounce off the suit of armour which Tisdaile is wearing.

At the very end of the film Hay can be heard breaking character and calling the character Tisdaile "Claude", the actor's real name. This may have been intentional as Hay had just told the cinema audience that it was "all clear" and that they could all go home.
Note that Charles Hawtrey was 26 years old when he portrayed Percy Thorne.

Cast

Will Hay – William Lamb
Claude Hulbert – Hilary Tisdaile
Charles Hawtrey – Percy Thorne
Raymond Huntley – Mr Humphries
Felix Aylmer – Dr Winter
Elliott Mason – Mrs Wigmore
John Laurie – Jamie MacLeod, the headmaster's assistant
Hay Petrie – Procurator Fiscal
Roddy Hughes – Amberley
Derek Blomfield – Sunshine
Brefni O'Rorke – Sergeant Macfarlane
Manning Whiley - Stock
Charles Mortimer - Sir Ambrose
Clive Baxter - Ritzy
David Keir - Dr Ritchie

External links

1941 films
1940s comedy thriller films
1940s spy thriller films
British black-and-white films
Ealing Studios films
Films directed by Marcel Varnel
Films set in Scotland
British World War II films
World War II films made in wartime
British comedy thriller films
Films produced by Michael Balcon
1941 comedy films
Films set in castles
Films set in schools
Films set on islands
Films about Nazis
1940s British films